= El Gabriel =

Filipino dancer and choreographer

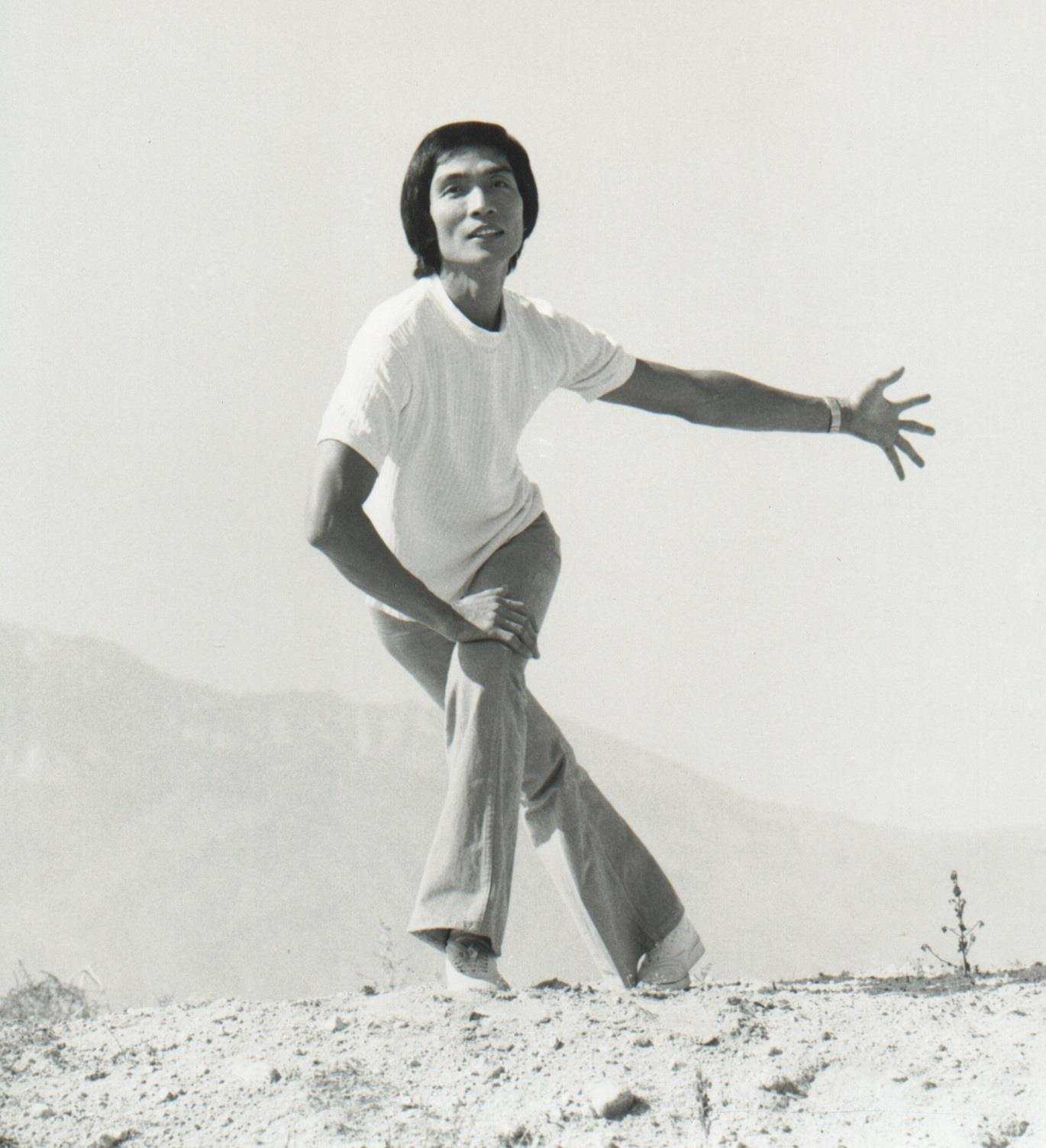
El Gabriel - Palm Springs, CA, 1974

Israel "El" Gabriel (23 October 1944 - 8 December 2020) was a Filipino dancer, choreographer, and educator resident in Los Angeles. Born in the Philippines and trained in New York, he worked with Dance Theater Philippines, Bat-Dor Dance Company in Tel Aviv, and the University of California, Irvine.

== Career ==
Gabriel was among the dancers produced by Anita Kane's troupe in the Philippines, and he later joined Dance Theater Philippines as a ballet master and choreographer. He was founding assistant director of Bat-Dor Dance Company in Tel Aviv and served as a full-time lecturer for UCI Dance from 1973 until his retirement in 2011.

The National Commission for Culture and the Arts lists Gabriel among Philippine dance choreographers, with works including Duetto, Jazz Piece on Ice, Le Printemps Eternel, Rashomon, and Caprice.
